The Soviet Water Polo Championship was the premier water polo in the Soviet Union. First held in 1925, it was disestablished in 1992 following the dissolution of the Soviet Union and succeeded by the Russian Championship. Three teams from the Soviet Championship, CSKA Moscow, Dynamo Moscow and MGU Moscow, won the European Cup and/or the Cup Winners' Cup.

Champions
  CSKA Moscow (21)
 1945, 1946, 1949, 1954, 1964, 1965, 1966, 1970, 1971, 1975, 1976, 1977, 1978, 1980, 1983, 1984, 1988, 1989, 1990, 1991, 1992
  Dynamo Moscow (11)
 1955, 1957, 1958, 1960, 1961, 1962, 1968, 1969, 1985, 1986, 1987
  Moscow XI (6)
 1925, 1936, 1956, 1959, 1963, 1967
  MGU Moscow (4)
 1972, 1973, 1974, 1979
  VMS Leningrad (3)
 1940, 1947, 1950
  Dynamo Leningrad (2)
 1938, 1939
  Torpedo Moscow (2)
 1948, 1953
  Dynamo Alma-Ata (2)
 1981, 1982
  Leningrad XI (1)
 1928
  Profsoyuzny (1)
 1934
  Elektrik Leningrad (1)
 1937

Other teams that made it into the top three
  Azerbaijan XI
  KKF Baku
  Dynamo Kyiv
  Dynamo Lviv
  Dinamo Tbilisi
  Georgia XI
  Moskovich AZLK
  Stalinets Moscow
  Trud Kyiv
  Ukraine XI

References

 
Water polo
Defunct water polo competitions
Water polo leagues in Europe